Decades of Worship is Christian singer Michael W. Smith's third compilation album, after The First Decade (1983-1993) and The Second Decade (1993-2003), released in 2012. The album mostly comprises Smith's live and studio worship music in the years 2001–2010. It also includes a remastered version of "Great Is The Lord" from his 1983 debut, Michael W. Smith Project as a bonus track.

Track listing

Chart performance

References

2012 compilation albums
Michael W. Smith compilation albums
Albums produced by Matt Bronleewe